Tiny Toon Adventures: Babs' Big Break is the first Tiny Toon Adventures game released on the Nintendo Game Boy. It was released in 1992 and was developed and published by Konami.

Gameplay
The player takes control of Buster Bunny, Plucky Duck, or Hamton J. Pig as they attempt to prevent Montana Max from thwarting Babs Bunny's dreams of becoming a big star. There are four stages, of which throughout, a special helper (Dizzy Devil, Furrball, Fifi La Fume, or Shirley the Loon) assists. Along the way are others that are a hindrance, such as Elmyra Duff, Arnold the Pit Bull, Roderick Rat and others.

Each of the three player characters has different weapons. Buster's carrots fly in an arc, Plucky throws pineapples that can bounce off the background, and Hamton throws watermelons that roll along the ground. The player can also collect various power-ups. Small hearts restore one heart. Large hearts will increase the player's life meter by one heart for the remainder of the level.

Gems can be collected and spent playing mini-games for more power-ups or extra lives. However, the player loses half of their gems when losing a life. If the player has collected 500 or more gems upon reaching the fight with Montana Max, he will offer to sell the theatre to the player, although this will only result in an alternate dialogue sequence, and the player will need to fight Montana Max. There is secret code that can be entered at the beginning of the game.

Reception
Nintendo Power rated the game 4th on their top 10 Game Boy games of 1992, they praised the game's graphics that they capture the spirit of the cartoon and the game has plenty of fun, side view action concluding: "The game is fun and you don’t have to be a fan of the Tiny Toons to enjoy it".

References

External links

1992 video games
Game Boy-only games
Konami games
Platform games
Side-scrolling video games
Video games based on Tiny Toon Adventures
Game Boy games
Video games developed in Japan
Single-player video games